Tema Reef, also called Tima Reef, is a submerged coral reef in the northern island group of the Cook Islands,  southeast of Pukapuka.

No coral or rock shows above water, but the sea breaks heavily over the reef.

History
Legend has it that Tima, an Aitutakian warrior sailed to Nassau, but was chased away by Ngalewu, a chief from Pukapuka. On his return to Aitutaki he passed the reef nearby and named it Te Toka-O-Tima, the Stone of Tima

The reef was sighted by Commodore John Byron on June 21, 1765. Captain William Williams of the missionary ship John Williams sighted the reef on May 15, 1864.

References

Reefs of the Cook Islands
Pukapuka
Northern Cook Islands